The Free Apostolic Church of Pentecost is the largest Greek Pentecostal (Protestant) church. Founded by Dr. Leonidas Feggos in 1965, it now counts more than 140 churches and over 10,000 members in Greece. The Free Apostolic Church of Pentecost has churches and missions also in Cyprus, Albania, Bulgaria, Germany, Belgium, Slovakia, United Kingdom, U.S. (New York and Ohio), Australia and Africa.

External links
 Official site
 WordofGod TV
 FACP Tube - On Demand Video Streaming
 EAEP Tube - Live Video Streaming
 Free Apostolic Church of Pentecost, New York

Christian organizations established in 1965
Pentecostal denominations established in the 20th century
Evangelicalism in Europe
Protestantism in Greece
Pentecostal denominations